Nazareth Elementary is a private co-educational  Catholic school teaching grades Pre-K through Grade 6 in Rochester, New York, USA. It is a ministry of the Sisters of St. Joseph.

History
Nazareth Academy was founded by the Sisters of Saint Joseph in 1871. It was the oldest Catholic high school in Rochester.

"One chance… often in life we are faced with a defining moment, where the choice we make will help determine our safety, our character, or our future."

Extracurricular activities

After School Clubs
After-School activities include:

100 Mile Club
Soccer Skills Club
Basketball Skills Club
Science Club

Clubs and organizations
Nazareth Elementary supports several clubs and organizations, including:

Children's Choir
Dulcimer club

Associated schools
Nazareth Academy was a part of Nazareth Schools, which also included an elementary (Nazareth Hall Elementary and Preschool) and middle school (Nazareth Hall Middle School) that were founded as a boys school in 1884. The original building was constructed in 1915; Nazareth Academy closed in 2010.

Performance
Nazareth Academy was accredited by the Middle States Association of Colleges and Schools, the New York State Board of Regents, and the New York State Association of Independent Schools. It was a member of the Greater Rochester Association of Private Schools.

References

External links
Nazareth Elementary website

Defunct Catholic secondary schools in New York (state)
Educational institutions established in 1871
Educational institutions disestablished in 2010
1871 establishments in New York (state)